Sture Björk is a Swedish orienteering competitor. He is Relay World Champion from 1968, as a member of the Swedish winning team, together with Sten-Olof Carlström, Karl Johansson and Göran Öhlund. He also obtained silver medal in the relay at the 1970 World Orienteering Championships in Eisenach, together with Björn Nordin, Karl Johansson and Bernt Frilén.

Björk has run for both OK Malmia and Ludvika OK.

References

Year of birth missing (living people)
Living people
Swedish orienteers
Male orienteers
Foot orienteers
World Orienteering Championships medalists
20th-century Swedish people